A Pocketful of Python is a series of five books by the Monty Python team, in which each of the surviving members selects their favourite material from the group’s TV series, films, records and books. The first two volumes, by Terry Jones and John Cleese, were released in 1999 as part of the team’s 30th anniversary celebrations. Two further volumes, by Terry Gilliam and Michael Palin, followed in 2000 while the final volume, by Eric Idle, was eventually released in 2002. Each team member’s volume includes a preface written by one of the other Pythons. In 2006 all five volumes were released as a single paperback edition, entitled The Very Best of Monty Python.

The concept of each Python choosing their favourite material was later revisited for the TV series Monty Python's Personal Best.

Contents

Volume 1 – Picked by Terry Jones
A  Preface by the Other Terry
Introduction
The French Taunt King Arthur
The Truth About Protestants
The Lumberjack Song
The Prodigal Son Returns
The News for Parrots
Rat Recipes
What Have the Romans Ever Done or Us?
A Page for Those Who Like Figures of Speech
Find the Fish
Albatross
Our Theatre Critic Reviews “The Merchant of Venice” Performed by the Dairy Herd of Bad Toltz
Madam Palm Writes
Spam
Constitutional Peasants
Every Sperm Is Sacred
The Undertaker Sketch
Madame Palm Writes Again
The Man Who Talks Entirely in Anagrams
Chez Rat
Banter
The Oxfod Simplified Dictionary
The Minister for Not Listening to People
The Court Martial of Sapper Walters
What the Stars Really Say
The Galaxy Song
Bibliography

Volume 2 – Picked by John Cleese

A Preface by Michael Palin
Eric the Half a Bee
Anne Elk’s Theory
The Official Medallic Commemoration of the History of Mankind
Raymond Luxury Yacht
African Notebook
Consulting Jean-Paul Sartre
We’re All Individuals
The Python Panel
Larch in Court
Fear No Man!
The Merchant Banker
Johann What’s-His-Name
The Last Supper
The Royal Society for Putting Things on Top of Other Things
Arthur ‘Two Sheds’ Jackson
Word Association Football
Norman Henderson’s Diary
The Sacred Castle
Spot the Species
Documentary
Chapel

Volume 3 – Picked by Terry Gilliam

Introduction
Join the BBC Today
The Meaning of Life
Careers Advice for Mr Anchovy
The Adventures of Walter the Wallabee
Brian in Gaol
What to do on Meeting the Royal Family
Gloria Pules & Luigi Vercotti  Remember the Piranha Brothers
Page 29
The German Lumberjack Song
Woody Words & Tinny Words
The Storyteller
Stan’s Right to Have Babies
Sexcraft
Why Accountancy is Not Boring
The Prince in the Tower
I’m So Worried
A Preface by Eric Idle for People Who Have Mistakenly Opened This Book Upside Down and Back to Front

Volume 4 – Picked by Michael Palin

A Preface by John Cleese
Introduction
All Things Dull & Ugly
Stig O’Tracey Remembers the Piranha Brothers
King Arthur Goes to See the Galahads
Goats Corner
The Healed Looney
Egon Ronay’s Good People Guide
The Cheese Shop
Madame Palm Writes Yet Again
The Problem with Spanish Holidays
Port Shoem by the Speverend Rooner
The Stratton Indicator
Winner of the Longest Stage Direction Ever
Middleword by E.F. God
Isn’t it Awfully Nice to Have a Penis
The All-England Summarize Proust Competition
The Stratton Indicator
The Architect Sketch
Never Be Rude to an Arab
The Martyrdom of St Brian
Mr Creosote
$tock Market Report
Novel Writing Live from Dorchester
The Knights Who Say ‘Ni’
A Letter to Michael Palin From the Producer of Monty Python and the Holy Grail

Volume 5 – Picked by Eric Idle

A Preface by Terry Jones
About the Editor
How to Talk to the Queen
The Batley Ladies Townswomen’s Guild
Children’s Page
The Story of the Grail
Spamelot!
Oh What a Lovely Dog
While You Were Out
How it All Began – the Story of Brian
Solly & Sarah
Python Literary Guild
The Hackenthorpe Book of Lies
Some Highlights from Masturbators of History
The Bruces Philosophers Song
Chez Bruce
Ashes to Ashes
How to Walk Silly
St Brian’s
The Upper-Class Twit of the Year Show
Kashmir
Chaos Theory Made E-Z
The Film Rights to This Page Are Still Available
Once Upon a Time
Mr Cheeky
Always Look on the Bright Side of Life
Foreword by the Late Graham Chapman

Credits

Writers - Graham Chapman, John Cleese, Terry Gilliam, Eric Idle, Terry Jones, Michael Palin
Editors - Geoffrey Strachan, John Cleese, Terry Gilliam, Eric Idle, Terry Jones, Michael Palin
Designers - Katy Hepburn, Alun Evans

References

Monty Python literature
Methuen Publishing books
1999 books
2000 books
2002 books